The Will of the Empress, previously titled The Circle Reforged, is a standalone fantasy novel by Tamora Pierce, a continuation of the story of the quartets Circle of Magic and The Circle Opens.

Plot summary

Empress Berenene
The primary plot of the novel is the struggle of Sandrilene fa Toren, a half-Namornese noblewoman, against her cousin, Empress Berenene of Namorn; Sandry had inherited the vast Namornese estate of Landreg from her mother, who had accustomed her to receiving a yearly income from the estate while rarely visiting it. Empress Berenene, who wants to keep the revenue from the estate within Namorn, repeatedly invites Sandry to visit her court in Dancruan while levying increasing taxes from her estate. When Sandry realizes that the Empress has been threatening Namorn's amicable trade with Emelan, she decides to accept the Empress's invitation and use the visit to visit her estate and Namornese family.

Sandry's uncle, Duke Vedris of Emelan, asks her childhood companions Daja Kisubo, Trisana Chandler and Briar Moss who have just come back from their travels to accompany her in lieu of a company of guards, a gesture both discourteous and ineffectual. Though their friendship with Sandry and with each other has become strained since their return to Summersea after years of world-traveling, Daja, Tris and Briar agree, and the four travel to Namorn together.

While there, they learn of the Western Namornese custom of bride kidnapping, which entails a man kidnapping a prospective bride and holding her captive until she agrees to sign a wedding contract. While the so-called "horse's rump" wedding is usually only used to bypass reluctant families or out of a sense of adventure, some marriages are forced, and the custom remains legal. Empress Berenene has never attempted to illegalize it despite having twice been kidnapped, because she believes her ability to escape both times means that only weak women would allow themselves to be forced into a marriage they don't want. When he hears of this, Briar comments that the Empress's captors are unlikely to have used the same level of violence as a common woman might encounter.

Because of their power and renown, Empress Berenene decides that Namorn stands to benefit if she persuades all four mages to remain in her court, in addition to Sandry and the funds from her Namornese estate. She offers Tris a position as a court mage with a large salary and benefits including access to the Imperial library, attempting to appeal to her merchant upbringing and her known bibliophily. She appeals to Briar by inviting him to her fantastic private greenhouses, offering him unlimited access as her personal gardener and showing him public favor, including an earldom. To entice Sandry to remain in court, she sends an entourage of four young nobles to escort her to Clehamat Landreg, including Finlach fer Hurich and Jakuben fer Pennun, who openly compete in their courtship of Sandry. Daja develops a relationship with Berenene's beautiful seamstress, Rizuka fa Dalach, which is encouraged by the Empress in order to keep Daja in Namorn.

When Fin, frustrated by Sandry's reluctance, kidnaps her with the aid of his uncle, locking her in a magic-proof box in the Julih Tunnel, a secret part of the castle, Sandry reconnects her magical bond with Briar while he is at a dance with Caidy, calling out to him for help. Briar and Tris succeed in extracting Sandry, and they decide to leave Namorn despite Empress Berenene's efforts to dissuade them and the incarceration of Fin and his uncle, until then the head of the Dancruan Mages' Society. The Empress then orders Ishabal Ladyhammer, her most powerful war-mage, to prevent the four from leaving to save face, and Ishabal casts a curse on Tris, causing her to fall down the stairs and fracture most of her bones.

The injured Tris insists that Sandry, Daja and Briar travel ahead of her, and she catch up to them when she recovers. Halfway to the border with Anderran Sandry is again kidnapped, this time by Pershan fer Roth, whose proposal of marriage she had refused shortly before leaving Dancruan, and Quenaill Shieldsman, a powerful court mage and Shan's rival for the Empress's attentions. 
Quen lays a powerful sleeping spell on Briar and Daja and magic-dampening spells on Sandry. Briar uses smelling salts he calls "Wake the Dead" to wake up Daja and they start to go after Sandry when they are confronted by Quenaill. Briar and Daja engage Quenaill, draining him until the spells on Sandry wear off. When Sandry wakes up, she is covered in charms to prevent her from using her magic. These charms are tied to her with ribbons and she is thus able to free herself. Sandry then uses thread magic to unravel her captors' clothing and cocoon them in the resulting threads.

After meeting up with Daja and Briar again, the party continue to the border. Aware that the empress may attempt to stop them, they send ahead their traveling companions and send their guards home. At the border, they are confronted by Ishabal Ladyhammer. She raises a barrier against them, but Sandry uses the circle of thread that binds them together to combine their powers. Tris, who had been travelling behind, magically accesses the ring from a distance, allowing the four mages to use their amplified power to shatter the border barrier. The thread circle disappears and all four now have a circular lump in their hand. Having invested much of her power in the barrier, Ishabal is magically drained when she leaves without attempting to stop Tris from crossing.

The Circle Reforged
The original title of the novel, The Circle Reforged, refers to the reforging of the four protagonists' friendship. In the year of the Circle of Magic quartet, Sandry, Tris, Daja and Briar live together and develop a strong friendship that manifests itself magically as a bond that allows them to communicate telepathically and causes their magical abilities to cross over from one to another. In The Circle Opens the four are separated, although their bond is clarified when they refer to each other as siblings or foster-siblings. Sandry remains in Summersea, living with her uncle in the Ducal Citadel, while Briar, Daja and Tris travel the world with their respective teachers. When they return, Daja after two years and Tris and Briar after four, the experiences they had while apart lead them to close their mental connection to each other, a representation of the distancing of their relationship. Sandry, feeling betrayed first by having been left behind, then by the telepathic wall, reciprocates in the same manner.

Throughout the first few chapters of the book the four mages fight frequently. Briar and Tris are invited by Daja to live in her new house, with Tris taking over housekeeping duties to assuage what she perceives as charity from her wealthier friends. Daja withholds the extent of her hurt at not being able to return to Winding Circle as well as her experiences with the arsonist Ben Ladradun during Cold Fire. Tris lies about her newly learned ability to scry on the wind because of the ill treatment she experienced from other mages who found out. Briar refuses to discuss his experiences of war in Gyongxe and his resulting post-traumatic stress disorder with anyone but Rosethorn, his teacher and traveling companion.

Sandry and Daja are the first to reopen their mental connection, ending their estrangement. Later in the book, Briar and Tris open their connection with each other. Some time later, Sandry telepathically calls out to Tris and Briar when she's trapped in a box, nearly paralyzed by spells that bind her magic and her own fear of the dark.  Eventually, their telepathic bond is completely restored, though they maintain their ability to screen their minds when they choose to. The bond, and the circle of thread that represents it, serve them in a joint magical working to breach the barrier on the Namorn-Anderran border during the book's climactic battle; once complete, Sandry finds the thread gone, and each of them is left with a scar on their right palm resembling the four lumps in the thread that had represented their magical identities.

In the post-climactic scene, each of the four reveals the secret that they had been keeping, and Briar introduces his sisters to a mental recreation of Discipline Cottage, their former home, which he had created and used when he wanted to feel safe.

Romantic sub-plot
The Will of the Empress is the first book set in Emelan to involve the protagonists in a romantic sub-plot. While previous books alluded to romantic relationships between the adult characters, none of the four main characters were shown to have romantic interests.

Sandry's visit to Namorn is punctuated by Empress Berenene's desire to see her marry a Namornese nobleman. She is courted by Jak and Fin, whose advances she rebuffs while maintaining a friendly acquaintance with them. She develops feeling for Shan and responds to his less public courtship, but when she learns that he's sexually involved with Empress Berenene, she doesn't pursue the relationship and rejects his offer of marriage. After Fin's incarceration Jak learns that Sandry is leaving Namorn and visits her before she leaves, when she tells him that she enjoys his company much more as a friend than as a suitor.

Daja meets Rizu, the Empress's Mistress of Wardrobe, developing an infatuation with her and commenting on her beauty and flirtatiousness. Her feelings remain unacknowledged until Rizu makes the first move and kisses her, resulting in awkwardness on the part of Sandry, who telepathically senses the kiss and is flustered by the rush of Daja's emotions while dancing with Fin. Daja and Rizu's relationship quickly becomes sexual, and is discovered by Briar when he finds Rizu in Daja's bedroom one morning naked. During their short relationship, Daja develops intense feelings for Rizu and shows a desire for her to be accepted as part of her siblings' inner circle, while they are reluctant.

When Daja prepares to leave Namorn she asks Rizu to return to Emelan with her and is heartbroken by her refusal; during the ride to the border she's shown to carry a small portrait of Rizu in her pouch. After Daja leaves, Berenene comments on Rizu's low spirits since her lover's departure.

Briar, coping with an unspecified war in the country of Yanjing, tends to romance as many women as he can, mainly Caidy. He reassures the others that he takes droughtwort, a plant that renders the eater temporarily sterile. He has vivid nightmares of the war in Gyongxe when he sleeps alone.

Characters

Major Characters
 Clehame Sandrilene fa Toren
 Daja Kisubo
 Trisana Chandler
 Briar Moss
 Berenene dor Ocmore, Empress of Namorn

Minor Characters

Imperial court
Bidisa Rizuka "Rizu" fa Dalach is the Imperial Mistress of Wardrobe, a young courtier who Empress Berenene assigns to Sandry's entourage. Rizu has a short-lived romantic relationship with Daja but refuses to leave Dancruan and return to Emelan with her.
Bidis Finlach "Fin" fer Hurich is a young courtier who pursues Sandry romantically, presumably on the Empress's orders. A miscommunication in which Sandry apparently abandons him at a ball provokes his temper, and he conspires with his uncle to kidnap Sandry and force her into marriage. When Sandry escapes her captivity, he is convicted of breaching the Empress's protection and is incarcerated.Ishabal Ladyhammer is a war-mage and the head of the Imperial mages. Because of her power and rank she is called "the Imperial will." She casts a curse on Tris and tries to keep the four mages from crossing the Namornese border. The battle leaves her magically drained.Empress Berenene dor Ocmore is the ruler of Namorn and Sandry's cousin through her mother, Amiliane fa Landreg. She invites Sandry to visit her court and tries to convince, then coerce, her to stay to keep her income from leaving the country. Briar shows interest in her because of her beauty, charm and amateur gardening, but never pursues a relationship, preferring to "worship her from afar."Saghad Jakuben "Jak" fer Pennun is a young courtier who pursues Sandry romantically, presumably on the Empress's orders. When he learns that Sandry is leaving Namorn he stops pursuing her romantically and they part on friendly terms. He mentions being raised by his mother to strongly oppose bride kidnapping after her childhood friend was kidnapped and committed suicide.Pershan "Shan" fer Roth is the Imperial Master of the Hunt and one of Empress Berenene's lovers. He pursues Sandry romantically in secret, hiding his intent of marrying her from the Empress for fear of her disapproval. Though his father is a Giath, Shan has no financial means of his own and depends on his employment for money. When Sandry refuses his proposal and leaves Dancruan, he conspires with Quenaill Shieldsman to kidnap her, but fails.Caidlene "Caidy" fa Sarajane is a young courtier who Empress Berenene assigns to Sandry's entourage. She and Briar flirt and kiss, although their casual relationship is often interrupted.Quenaill "Quen" Shieldsman is a war-mage and Ishabal Ladyhammer's second-in-command, providing Empress Berenene with magical protective shields. A former lover of the Empress, he was replaced in her attentions by Shan. When Shan intends to marry Sandry, Quen aids him with the hopes that once Shan falls out of imperial favor, he will take his place again.

Clehamat LandregZhegorz Fiavrus is a schizophrenic mage, initially a beggar who Daja first met in Cold Fire when he was a patient in the mental ward at a hospital in Kugisko, although he wasn't named.  Tamora Pierce has stated that she based Zhegorz's character on heavy metal musician Alice Cooper.Gudruny Iarun is a villager from Landreg. She appealed to Sandry's mother, her overlady, to annul her marriage, but was ignored, but after Gudruny breaks into her room and begs her to dissolve her marriage. Sandry does this, and hires Gudruny as her maid and her two children as pages; all three return to Emelan with her party, Sandry and Gudruny having developed a relationship of confidence.Halmar Iarun is a miller from Landreg and the former husband of Gudruny. During their marriages he abused her verbally and sometimes physically. When Gudruny appealed to their overlady to dissolve the marriage, Halmar followed her to try and prevent her from leaving. He was restrained by the Landreg men-at-arms, thrown out of the manor, and his marriage was dissolved.Ambros fer Landreg is Sandry's cousin through her mother, Amiliane fa Landreg. Initially a Saghad and a steward of Sandry's estates, in the post-climax Sandry transfers ownership of Landreg to him, making him a Cleham. Ambros is married to Ealaga, and they have four daughters between the ages of five and twelve.Wenoura is the cook in the Landreg townhouse.

OthersBidis Dymytur fer Holm and Saghad'' Yeskoy fer Haugh are minor Namornese nobles turned bandits who try to kidnap Sandry during a riding expedition in Landreg.
Notalos fer Hurich is a Namornese nobleman and mage, the head of the Mages' Society. His status does not protect him when he collaborates with his nephew, Fin, in kidnapping Sandry while she is under Imperial protection, and he is convicted and incarcerated.
Maedryan dor Ocmore is a Namornese princess, the youngest daughter and heiress of Empress Berenene. The Empress keeps secret the identity of Maedryan's father, as well as the fathers of her other two daughters. To protect her from bride kidnapping, the Empress has removed her from the court at Dancruan and placed her with a foster family, the identity of which is likewise kept secret.
Franzen fer Toren is an Emelanese noble, the third son and heir of Duke Vedris IV. He is mentioned in Magic Steps'', where his first name appears as "Frantsen."
Gospard fer Toren is an Emelanese noble, Duke Veris IV's middle son and admiral of the Emelanese navy.

Footnotes

Emelanese books
2005 American novels
2005 fantasy novels